George Binney Dibblee (1868 - 27 August 1952) was a newspaperman and academic who was manager of the Manchester Guardian and a noted authority on the idea of supply and demand.

Selected publications
 The Laws of Supply and Demand, with Special Reference to Their Influence on Over Production and Unemployment, Constable, London, 1912.
 The Newspaper, Williams & Norgate, London, 1915. (Home University Library of Modern Knowledge)
 The Psychological Theory of Value, Constable, London, 1924.<ref>[https://www.jstor.org/stable/3004425?seq=1#page_scan_tab_contents "Reviewed Work: The Psychological Theory of Value. by George Binney Dibblee"], B.W. Knight, Social Forces, Vol. 4, No. 1 (Sep., 1925), pp. 224-226.</ref>
 Instinct and Intuition. A Study in Mental Duality'', Faber & Faber, London, 1929.

References

External links 

 George Binney Dibblee
 The Newspaper and its Influence

1868 births
1952 deaths
Newspaper executives
British non-fiction writers
British academics